The Slano Blato Landslide, or the Salt Mud Slide, is a periodic landslide in Slovenia that is triggered approximately once a century. 
Although around 8,000 active landslides are present in Slovenia, the Slano Blato Landslide stands out as one of the most serious in terms of the damage it has caused.

The landslide is located on the southern edge of the Trnovo Plateau of the Dinaric Alps, below Mount Čaven and Little Mountain next to the Platna mountain pasture. It is moving along Grajšček Creek (which also originates in the landslide itself) toward the settlement of Lokavec near Ajdovščina. Its maximum flow rate was recorded at /day.

Name
The name of the landslide area was recorded as Blatna ('muddy') in 1881. The origin of the designation 'salt(y)' (Slovene slan) is uncertain. A local folk belief states that the high cleanup cost of the landslide resulted in an exorbitant cost (cf. Slovene zasoliti 'to over-salt'; metaphorically, 'to charge excessively'). However, the landslide bore the designation 'salt(y)' before any cleanup efforts were ever made.

Other locals state that sheep used to wander down to the area from nearby pastures, where they would lick the mud as a natural salt lick. This basis for the name's origin is supported by the fact that chemical analysis of the water at the landslide has shown it to have a very high mineral content, including sodium sulfate, also known as Glauber's salt.

History and activity
Oral tradition regarding the landslide goes back four centuries, connecting it to the construction of a small church dedicated to Saint Urban on the slope of Mount Čaven above Lokavec and below the landslide. Saint Urban was invoked as a protector against natural disasters, and particularly with regard to a lake that people believed was hidden inside Mount Čaven that threatened to flood the valley.

A 1789 source by Belsazar Hacquet mentioned the landslide, describing its debris flow in 1786. It was described again in an 1887 report that discussed the landslide event of 20 October 1885, in which 30 m of the road from Ajdovščina to Gorizia was destroyed. Cleanup efforts and landslide mitigation measures were carried out by Austrian authorities in 1903.

A secondary flow was triggered in September 2001. The landslide stopped moving after this and is currently considered stable.

References

External links 
Platna Pasture at Geopedia, showing the adjacent (unlabeled) Slano Blato Landslide

Landslides in Slovenia
Dinaric Alps
Geology of Slovenia
2000 in Slovenia 
2000 disasters in Slovenia